Mesites is a genus of true weevils in the family of beetles known as Curculionidae. There are at least 30 described species in Mesites.

Species
These 31 species belong to the genus Mesites:

 Mesites aequitanus Reitter, E., 1898 c
 Mesites akbesianus Desbr., 1894-95 c
 Mesites angustior Pic, M., 1900 c
 Mesites aquitanus Fairmaire, L., 1859 c
 Mesites ater Lindberg, 1950 c
 Mesites complanatus Wollaston, T.V., 1861 c
 Mesites crassaticornis Peyerimhoff, 1949 c
 Mesites cribratus Fairmaire, L., 1856 c
 Mesites cribripennis Desbr., 1892-93 c
 Mesites cunipes Boheman, 1838 c
 Mesites deserticus Escalera, 1914 c
 Mesites euphorbiae Wollaston, T.V., 1854 c
 Mesites fusiformis Wollaston, T.V., 1861 c
 Mesites gomerensis Uyttenboogaart, 1937 c
 Mesites hesperus Wollaston, T.V., 1867 c
 Mesites hozmani Folwaczny, 1984 c
 Mesites maderensis Wollaston, T.V., 1854 c
 Mesites mimoides Voss, 1934 c
 Mesites mogadoricus Escalera, 1914 c
 Mesites nitidicollis Folwaczny, 1973 c
 Mesites pallidipennis Boheman, 1838 c
 Mesites persimilis Wollaston, T.V., 1861 c
 Mesites proximus Wollaston, T.V., 1861 c
 Mesites pubipennis Wollaston, T.V., 1861 c
 Mesites rubricatus Hoffmann, 1965 c
 Mesites rufipennis LeConte, 1878 i c b
 Mesites subcylindricus (Horn, 1873) i c b
 Mesites subvittatus Motschulsky, V. de, 1866 c
 Mesites suturalis Motschulsky, V. de, 1866 c
 Mesites tardyi Curtis, J., 1825 c
 Mesites therondi Tempère, 1961 c

Data sources: i = ITIS, c = Catalogue of Life, g = GBIF, b = Bugguide.net

References

Further reading

External links

 

Cossoninae
Articles created by Qbugbot